Drawing Circles is the second studio album by Dutch metal band Textures. It was released on October 16, 2006, by Listenable Records. It marks the first album to feature vocalist Eric Kalsbeek.

A video was made for the track "Millstone."

Track listing 
All music and lyrics by Textures.

Personnel
Textures
Jochem Jacobs – guitar, backing vocals
Stef Broks – drums
Dennis Aarts – bass guitar
Bart Hennephof – guitar, backing vocals
Eric Kalsbeek – lead vocals
Richard Rietdijk – synthesizer, keyboards

Production
Jochem Jacobs - engineering, mixing
Björn Engelmann - mastering
Sander van Gelswijck - engineering
Eric Kalsbeek - artwork, layout
Bart Hennephof - artwork

Textures (band) albums
2006 albums
Listenable Records albums